Wind power generates about 10% of Turkey's electricity, mainly in the west in the Aegean and Marmara regions, and is gradually becoming a larger share of renewable energy in the country. , Turkey has 11 gigawatts (GW) of wind turbines. The Energy Ministry plans to have almost 30 GW by 2035.

The state-owned Electricity Generation Company (EÜAŞ) has about 20% of the market, and there are many private companies. The highest ever daily share of wind was 25%, in 2022.

Building new wind farms is cheaper than running existing coal plants which depend on imported coal. According to modelling by Carbon Tracker, new wind will be cheaper than all existing coal plants by 2027.

History

Some of the earliest windmills were built 400 years ago out of stone. Using wind from the Aegean Sea, these mills were used to grind wheat into flour until the 1970s. On windy days a mill could grind 20 sacks of wheat (about 320 kg) in an hour, and corn and barley were also milled. Such historic windmills on the Bodrum Peninsula are being restored for tourism. Likewise, on Bozcaada, two derelict mills have been reconstructed and are used for tourist demonstrations. 

The first wind farm was built in Izmir in 1998. While the installed capacity of wind power was 19 megawatts (MW) in 2006, it grew to 140 MW by 2007, and to over 1,600 MW by 2011. In the 2010s some windpower was used for carbon offsets.

A wind turbine factory was completed in 2019, also in İzmir. In 2020 1.6 billion euros were invested in wind power. Hybrid generation became more popular in the early 2020s.

Wind farms
There are about 300 wind farms in Turkey, all onshore, totalling about 4,000 wind turbines. In 2022 total installed capacity passed 11 GW, and capacity factor is high at around 40%.  The company with the most wind power (nine wind farms as of 2022) is Borusan EnBW Enerji, a joint venture between Borusan and Germany power utility Energie Baden-Wurttemberg. The maximum power of unlicensed installations is 5 MW. One billion euros was invested in 2021 and 1.4 GW built: average power rating was over 5 GW, which was higher than other European countries onshore.  the largest wind farm in the country is Soma, followed by Karaburun.

Aliağa Wind Farm

Bahçe Wind Farm

Çanta Wind Farm

Dağpazarı Wind Farm

Mut Wind Farm

Şamlı Wind Farm

Soma Wind Farm

Planned and under construction 
In 2022 contracts for 20 wind farms totalling 850 MW were auctioned at prices from 408 lira (USD 24/EUR 22) to 778 lira per MWh. However the government target of 20 GW by 2023 was not met. The government published a long-term National Energy Plan in 2023 which targets almost 30 GW by 2035.

Onshore wind potential 
The Energy Ministry estimates onshore potential as 48 GW at 50 m altitude in places with wind speed over 7.5 m/s: the estimate assumes 5 MW capacity turbines. The north-west is the windiest, averaging about 7 m/s at 50 m high, and has the most wind farms. Mountain ranges in the west run at right angles to the coast, so wind flows easily inland. Also, the north-west uses a lot of energy, so there are only a few wind farms in other parts of the country. 

A high-voltage direct current link from the windy islands of Bozcaada and Gokceada to Istanbul has been suggested. For an off-grid zero-energy house, an islanded hybrid system with solar and battery has been suggested.

The politics of electricity generation are almost all about its price, not about wind power specifically. In general public opinion supports wind power, although sometimes locals complain of insufficient consultation.

Offshore wind potential 
Technical potential is 12 GW fixed and 63 GW floating turbines. There is collaboration with Denmark to plan offshore wind power: the Marmara Sea is considered most suitable, but the Black Sea is also a possible location, as is the Aegean near Çanakkale. Floating turbines have been modelled because off many coasts depths increase quickly. A 2022 study suggested that the grid code needed improvements, specifically that "active power control and frequency regulation, reactive power control and voltage regulation, and voltage ride-through capabilities should be clarified in detail".

Environmental impact 
Wind farms are prohibited on globally important bird migration routes (including critical migration bottlenecks such as İstanbul Strait, Çanakkale Strait, Belen in Hatay, Borçka in Artvin), some of which are high wind speed areas. On average one or two birds are estimated to be killed by each turbine each year, mostly small- and medium-size birds. However, the study found that the number of fatalities was not related to the number of birds or flights near the turbine. Environmental impact reports are more stringent for wind farms over 50 MW. 

As the wind farms are relatively new and are assumed to operate for 25 years, their lifecycle environmental impact, such as what percentage of various metals will be recycled, is not yet known exactly. However, as their electricity is substituting that of coal and gas-fired power stations, it is certain that they are an overall good for the environment by helping to limit greenhouse gas (GHG) emissions by Turkey. Lifecycle GHG emissions have been estimated at 15 g CO2eq/kWh (whereas fossil fuel power emits hundreds of g CO2 eq./kWh).

Economics 
The Turkish Wind Energy Association said in 2021 that over 20 thousand people were directly employed by the sector. According to a May 2022 report from think tank Ember, wind and solar saved 7 billion dollars on gas imports in the preceding 12 months.

Feed-in tariff 

From 2005, there was a feed-in tariff in Turkish lira which met with poor market uptake. After being denominated in dollars from 2011 to 2020, the tariff reverted to lira with new rules. The feed-in tariff applies for 10 years. There are extra payments for domestic content.

Auctions 
In 2017, the Ministry of Energy and Natural Resources launched a US$1 billion wind power investment project, and issued a request for tender. The project, titled YEKA, was for wind farms in five different regions in the country with a total power capacity of 1 GW and at least 3 TWh energy generated annually, an extra 1% of electricity in Turkey.

The German-Turkish consortium of Siemens-Türkerler-Kalyon bid lowest at US$34.8 per MWh. The consortium is carrying out research and development, for ten years, on wind turbine blades, generator design, material technologies and production techniques, software and innovative gearboxes. The R&D is done by fifty technical personnel, 80% of whom are Turkish engineers, with a budget of US$5 million per year.

In 2019, the second 1 GW tender was won for four equal capacity projects in Balıkesir, Çanakkale, Aydın and Muğla, which are all provinces on the west coast. The same year the European Bank for Reconstruction and Development invested US$100 million in wind and solar power in Turkey.  auction prices were around US$40 per MWh. Think tank Ember say that energy policy should be changed to auction for far more solar and wind power.

Since April 2022 low-cost generators such as wind have had their wholesale prices capped (this does not affect unlicensed and FiT): this can be considered a type of windfall tax.  it is unclear whether the money will be a general tax or will be used to subsidise high-cost generators such as gas.

Merchant projects have won licences with negative bids (meaning the companies pay the government for licences) and are expected to come online in the mid-2020s.

Manufacturing 
Nacelles are manufactured locally by Siemens, but most wind turbines are imported. Over half of the supply chain is local, from about 80 companies. It has been estimated that there is potential for about 240 million tons of green hydrogen to be produced by electrolysis of water by wind power.

See also 
 Energy law
 Energy in Turkey#Policy and regulation

External links 
 Turkish Wind Energy Association
 Up-to-date statistics on wind power in Turkey

References